Red River Radio is the regional public radio station for northwest Louisiana, southern Arkansas, eastern Texas, and the southeasternmost corner of Oklahoma.  The network is headquartered on the campus of Louisiana State University in Shreveport. 

The Red River Radio listening region is one of the largest coverage areas for public radio in the United States.

Stations
Red River Radio consists of five stations and one translator:

Programming
Red River Radio (RRR) is affiliated with National Public Radio and broadcasts many popular NPR programs including Morning Edition, All Things Considered, Fresh Air, World Cafe, Car Talk, Wait Wait... Don't Tell Me, and From the Top.  The network also broadcasts many Public Radio Exchange programs including This American Life and To the Point and many programs from American Public Media, including Marketplace Money, Performance Today, A Prairie Home Companion, and The Splendid Table. Red River Radio broadcasts many independently produced programs such as Art of the Song, Beale Street Caravan, Blues Before Sunrise, Bluegrass Breakdown, Classical Guitar Alive, Hearts of Space, intelligence2 Dates, New Orleans All the Way Live, Radiolab, Snap Judgment, With Heart and Voice, and Women in Music.

Red River Radio provides local news weekday mornings during Morning Edition. In 2005, news producer Kate Archer pioneered a community news-gathering effort called the Community Correspondent program in which residents of the community borrow equipment from the network to produce local stories for broadcast during the local newscasts.

Some of the programs aired on RRR are produced locally, at the KDAQ studio. For instance, Wally Derleth hosts Evening Jazz, featuring nights dedicated to big band, contemporary  and other subgenres of jazz music. Other locally produced programs include Blues After Hours, hosted by John Ellis and Regional Symphony Broadcasts, hosted by Kermit Poling. A previously-aired local program, Soul Review, dedicated to classic soul and R&B from the 1960s to the 1980s, was hosted by Eric Jenkins from 2008 to 2011.

Numerous local and national contributors provide educational and often compelling commentary at different times during the week. Currently, these short radio segments include A Moment of Science, Get It Growing, Earth and Sky, History Matters, Eco Tech Minute, What Was I Thinking?, Dr. Archie McDonald's Commentary, The Big Picture With Alexandyr Kent, Stardate, and Spotlights.

Station operation and development
Like most public radio stations, RRR is funded primarily by its members.  Twice each year, the network conducts a membership campaign pledge drive to pay for programming and ongoing operational costs. For the past several pledge drives, RRR has met or exceeded its membership goals, and at the halfway point through fiscal year 2009 had recorded its best support ever, despite the uncertain economy.

For over two decades, Red River Radio operated out of cramped quarters in a temporary building at the LSUS campus.  However, a separate funding campaign was launched in 2007 to construct a new building on campus, that would house production and on-air studios, as well as a small concert hall. Keeping in step with technological advances in broadcasting, RRR was already sending out two of its signals via the new technology called HD Radio, by mid-2007. Currently there are three HD streams for KDAQ. The HD1 stream is a digital version of the regular programming, HD2 is Classical Music, and HD3 has News/Talk with additional programs not found in the regular lineup, allowing for more choices throughout the day and night.

The long-awaited move of the radio station into new facilities, located in a renovated building on the edge of the LSUS campus, was completed on December 5, 2012. The new facilities and studio space of KDAQ were redesigned out of the former Baptist Student Union Building, which also served as a church sanctuary.

Notes

External links
 Red River Radio Online

Louisiana State University System
Mass media in Shreveport, Louisiana
NPR member networks